Ivan Lendl was the defending champion, but lost in the second round this year.

John McEnroe successfully defended his title, defeating Vitas Gerulaitis 6–0, 6–3 in the final.

Seeds

  Ivan Lendl (second round)
  John McEnroe (champion)
  Jimmy Connors (semifinals)
  Jimmy Arias (quarterfinals)
  Johan Kriek (second round)
  Anders Järryd (third round)
  Eliot Teltscher (quarterfinals)
  Vitas Gerulaitis (final)
  Pat Cash (third round)
  Joakim Nyström (second round)
  Tim Mayotte (first round)
  Bill Scanlon (third round)
  Kevin Curren (semifinals)
  Henri Leconte (third round)
  Heinz Günthardt (first round)
  Peter Fleming (quarterfinals)

Draw

Finals

Top half

Section 1

Section 2

Section 3

Section 4

External links
 Main draw

1984 Grand Prix (tennis)